After Midnight is a 1937 novel by Irmgard Keun, set in Frankfurt am Main during the early Nazi period.

Plot

Frankfurt am Main, 1936. Sanna Moder is in love with her cousin Franz, and she and her friends try and enjoy life and what freedom they have in a city and country that is falling deeper under Nazi rule.

Publication

After Midnight was rejected by Keun's Amsterdam-based publisher Allert de Lange, who feared that the book would damage the firm's commercial interests in Germany. Another Amsterdam-based publisher, Querido, would publish the book in 1937. An English edition was published the following year by Alfred A. Knopf, translated by James Cleugh.

Reception

Publishers Weekly wrote of it "Much of the material is dated, and the clever repartees, the little ironies seem sadly irrelevant now. Yet Keun's spirited defense of common decency stands out after all this time." In Inside Story, Dr Geoff Wilkes called it "a minor masterpiece of satiric simplicity."

Adaptations

In 1981, After Midnight was adapted into a film, directed by Wolf Gremm and starring Désirée Nosbusch as Sanna.

References

1937 German novels
Fiction set in 1936
Novels about Nazi Germany
German political novels
Novels by Irmgard Keun
German novels adapted into films